Ricasoli may refer to:

People
 Bettino Ricasoli (1809–1880), Italian statesman
 Giovanni Francesco Ricasoli (died 1673), Italian knight and naval officer

Other uses
 Fort Ricasoli, a fort in Kalkara, Malta
 Italian destroyer Bettino Ricasoli